Mount Russell is one of the major peaks of the central Alaska Range, approximately  southwest of Denali. Though much lower than Denali or its neighbor Mount Foraker, Russell is a steep, dramatic peak and a significant mountaineering challenge in its own right.

Mount Russell is the highest point in the Kuskokwim River watershed.

The first ascent of Mount Russell was made on May 28, 1962, by a party led by Hellmut Raithel. The summit party comprised Klaus Ekkerlein, Robert Goodwin, and Peter Hennig. They ascended the West Face from the Chedotlothna Glacier. The second ascent was in July 1972, by Thomas Kensler, Peter Brown, John Hauck, Dick Jablonowski, and Daniel L. Osborne. That ascent proceeded via the now-standard North East Ridge route, from the high basin of the upper Yentna Glacier to the northeast of the peak. This route is rated at Alaska Grade 2+, and is made much shorter by the feasibility of landing at around 8,000 feet in the basin, just outside the wilderness portion of the park.

Overshadowed as it is by its larger neighbors, Mount Russell had seen only six recorded ascents by 2001. However guided climbs of the peak are available.


See also

List of mountain peaks of North America
List of mountain peaks of the United States
List of mountain peaks of Alaska
List of Ultras of the United States

References

External links

Alaska Range
Mountains of Denali Borough, Alaska
Mountains of Matanuska-Susitna Borough, Alaska
Mountains of Alaska